Achyra is a genus of moths of the family Crambidae described by Achille Guenée in 1849.

Species
Achyra affinitalis (Lederer, 1863)
Achyra arida Maes, 2005
Achyra bifidalis (Fabricius, 1794)
Achyra brasiliensis Capps, 1967
Achyra coelatalis (Walker, 1859)
Achyra eneanalis (Schaus, 1923)
Achyra imperialis (Sauber in Semper, 1899)
Achyra llaguenalis Munroe, 1978
Achyra massalis (Walker, 1859)
Achyra nigrirenalis (Hampson, 1913)
Achyra nudalis (Hübner, 1796)
Achyra occidentalis (Packard, 1873)
Achyra piuralis (Capps, 1967)
Achyra prionogramma (Meyrick, 1886)
Achyra protealis (Warren, 1892)
Achyra rantalis (Guenée, 1854) – garden webworm moth
Achyra serrulata (Turner, 1932)
Achyra takowensis Maes, 1987

Former species
Achyra similalis Guenée, 1854

References

Pyraustinae
Crambidae genera
Taxa named by Achille Guenée